The Oshkosh L-ATV (Light Combat Tactical All-Terrain Vehicle) is a light utility/combat multi-role vehicle that won the US military's Army-led Joint Light Tactical Vehicle (JLTV) program. In the very early stages of the program it was suggested that JLTV would replace the AM General High Mobility Multi-purpose Wheeled Vehicle (HMMWV) on a one-for-one basis. It is now suggested that the JLTV will part-replace the HMMWV, not replace it on a like-for-like basis.

The L-ATV was designed to deliver a level of protection comparable to that of heavier and less maneuverable Mine Resistant Ambush Protected (MRAP) class designs, these having more protection from blast than up-armored HMMWVs which they were delivered to replace on deployed operations.

On 25 August 2015, the L-ATV was selected as the winner of the JLTV program. The first JLTV delivery order was placed in March 2016 with the U.S. Army ordering 657 examples. Overall requirements have fluctuated, but as of January 2022 were stated by Micheal Sprang, JLTV Project Director to be: Army – 49,099 (this figure has remained relatively constant); Marine Corps – 12,500 (approx.); Air Force – 2000 (dependent on funding); Navy (approx. 400).

The Army received its first seven JLTVs for test at the end of September 2016, Colonel Shane Fullmer, JLTV project manager stated at an AUSA 2016 media briefing.

In addition to the United States, three other nations currently operate the JLTV and four more have JLTV on order.

History

Background

The idea for the Joint Light Tactical Vehicle (JLTV) first emerged in 2006 from threats experienced during the Iraq War. The primary tactical wheeled vehicle used by the U.S. military at the start of the war was the Humvee. However, most were unarmored and the type (including armored examples) incurred heavy losses when improvised explosive devices (IEDs) began being employed by insurgents. The initial response was to add armor, or more armor to armored models, and primarily on the sides. This improved side protection against direct fire and associated threats, but since the chassis was not designed to handle any further additional weight, there was little room for underbody protection. The added armor weight greatly reduced remaining useful payload capacity (within max gross weight), negatively impacted off-road mobility, compromised vehicle reliability, and greatly increased their maintenance needs (frequency, labor and parts costs).

To combat increasing numbers of IED attacks, the U.S. spent around $50 billion rapidly procuring some 29,000 Mine Resistant Ambush Protected (MRAP) vehicles, including the Oshkosh M-ATV for use in Iraq and Afghanistan. While MRAPs offered superior protection from IEDs, especially underbody blasts, they were significantly larger and heavier and had relatively poor off-road mobility. The military incorporated MRAPs in response to operational needs, but never intended them to become a permanent part of their tactical wheeled vehicle fleets. At the conclusion of operations, many thousands were either scrapped, adapted for other roles, or offered for sale/transfer to allies. Ultimately U.S. armed forces would retain over 11,100 MRAPS, just over 6,350 of these Oshkosh M-ATVs. The bulk of retained MRAPS are mothballed in prepositioned stocks around the world.

Since up-armoring Humvees and buying MRAPs addressed specific issues but created gaps in vehicle capabilities, the JLTV program was started to incorporate lessons learned and balance payload, mobility, and protection into a new vehicle. Its purpose was to restore the mobility commanders had with the original Humvee, while having the side and underbody protection of a basic MRAP. It would be around two-thirds the weight of an MRAP, possible to be carried under a CH-47 Chinook and CH-53E Super Stallion and by amphibious vessels, things impossible for an MRAP. It would also be 70 percent faster off-road, adding to survivability by enabling it to egress a combat situation faster. Compared to the Humvee, the JLTV was to have the mobility of early unarmored versions with greater protection than up-armored versions, along with greater reliability, payload capacity, and ease of repair. The JLTV is the first vehicle purpose-built for network connectivity into the Warfighter Information Network-Tactical.

Unveiling and testing
Oshkosh Defense first displayed the L-ATV at Association of the United States Army (AUSA) in Washington, D.C. on 10 October to 12 October 2011. This, the first 'public appearance' for the design, was not an open appearance and came in the form of closed combined briefings/viewings to invited attendees only. Oshkosh briefed Jane's Independent Defense Review that the L-ATV has developmental origins that trace back to 2007 and Oshkosh/Northrop-Grumman's failed JLTV proposal, with some sub-systems having a lineage that trace back to 2005. At the time, L-ATV was the lightest tactical vehicle designed by Oshkosh, being some 50% lighter than anything previously produced by the company.

At AUSA 2011, Oshkosh suggested that following then recent program developments, L-ATV would be offered to meet the recently revitalized JLTV's EMD (Engineering & Manufacturing Development) phase. On 26 January 2012, the RFP for JLTV's EMD Phase was released. On 23 August 2012, the Army and Marine Corps selected the Oshkosh Defense L-ATV, as well as the Lockheed Martin JLTV entry and AM General BRV-O, as the winners of the Engineering and Manufacturing Development (EMD) phase of the JLTV competition. They were awarded a contract to build 22 prototype vehicles in 27 months to be judged by the services.

On 6 February 2013, Oshkosh unveiled the Utility Variant of its JLTV offer, fulfilling JLTV's requirement for a two-seat cargo vehicle. The vehicle's performance was demonstrated at the 2013 NATC Technology Rodeo at the Nevada Automotive Test Center (NATC). The Utility Variant is designed to provide mobility for loads such as containers, pallets, and break bulk cargo. It can also be outfitted as a shelter carrier to carry standard shelters for communications systems, on-board electronics, and other functions. Payload capacity is in excess of 5,100 pounds. Both Oshkosh L-ATV variants leverage a common crew protection system, automotive systems, and the patented Oshkosh TAK-4i™ intelligent independent suspension system.

In June 2013, L-ATV prototypes participated in an event hosted by the U.S. JLTV Joint Program Office in Quantico, VA. The vehicles successfully completed the severe off-road track (SORT) without failure. The SORT demonstrated the L-ATV's ability to maneuver steep inclines, turn sharply, and operate in rugged terrain. On 8 August 2013, Oshkosh delivered its first L-ATV JLTV prototype to the Army for government testing following a successful vehicle inspection by the Defense Contract Management Agency (DCMA). The four-door variant (which has two base platforms – Close Combat Weapons Carrier (CCWC) and the General Purpose (GP)) and two-door Utility Variant were provided for evaluations.

On 27 August 2013, the Army and Marine Corps announced that full-scale testing of JLTV prototypes would begin the following week, with all three vendors having had 66 vehicles delivered. Each company delivered 22 vehicles and six trailers to Aberdeen Proving Ground, Maryland, and Yuma Proving Ground, Arizona. Previous testing had already put the vehicles through more than 400 ballistic and blast tests on armor testing samples, underbody blast testing, and more than 1,000 miles in shakedown testing. Soldiers from the Army Test and Evaluation Command and personnel from the Defense Department's Office of Test and Evaluation would begin to put the vehicles through realistic and rigorous field testing during 14 months of government performance testing. Testing was scheduled for completion by FY 2015, with a production contract to be awarded to a single vendor for almost 55,000 vehicles (49,099 Army; 5,500 Marines). The average unit manufacturing cost in A-kit (fitted for but not with armor) configuration was not to exceed $250,000. The Army set an Initial Operating Capability (IOC) of May 2018 and planned to complete its fielding by FY2040. The Marines had an IOC of December 2017, and planned to complete its fielding by FY2022. On 3 September 2013, full-pace, full-scope JLTV testing began at Aberdeen Proving Ground, Yuma, and Redstone Arsenal, Alabama. One vendor was to be selected by July 2015, and produce 2,000 vehicles for three years of additional testing to fine-tune the assembly line and full-up the system.

In July 2014, the L-ATV completed Net-Ready testing as part of the JLTV program, involving transferring data from onboard systems to external networks. On 17 July 2014, Oshkosh announced the L-ATV had completed 200,000 miles and all requirements for Reliability, Availability, Maintainability (RAM) testing. On 19 November 2014, Oshkosh announced the L-ATV had completed Limited User Testing (LUT) with the U.S. Army and Marine Corps for the JLTV EMD contract. The LUT focused on JLTV system capabilities, functions, operations, and interfaces in a range of simulated tactical environments covering operator and crew-level preventive maintenance for the entire system, ensuring they could operate proficiently and safely. The Army held theirs the previous September and October, where three tests were held as 96-hour cycles to simulate operational missions, one of which incorporated a live fire demonstration. The Marines completed two test cycles in October and November with one live fire demonstration. The Army released the final JLTV RFP on 12 December 2014. On 10 February 2015 Oshkosh Defense issued a press release announcing the company had submitted its proposal (the L-ATV) in response to the JLTV Low Rate Initial Production (LRIP) and Full Rate Production (FRP) RFP.

On 31 March 2015, Oshkosh announced it would show its JLTV offering, the L-ATV, at the AUSA 2015 Global Force Symposium and Exposition in Huntsville, Alabama. The company also announced it would show its Virtual Task Trainer (VTT) for the L-ATV at the conference. The VTT is an interactive training module that provides interactive 3D training for soldiers in a safe and lifelike virtual environment. Speaking of the VTT, Mike Ivy, vice president of global integrated product support for Oshkosh Defense said: "The addition of Oshkosh's virtual training to our multi-faceted curriculum reduces the cost of operator training by improving training effectiveness and efficiency." He added: "We deployed the VTT to train operators during early JLTV testing with great results. Soldiers were really engaged, and our training was not only better, but it took less time than it would have without the VTT. This represents a significant cost savings opportunity for the government."

Selection, production and fielding
On 25 August 2015, the Army selected the Oshkosh L-ATV as the winner of the JLTV program. The company was awarded a $6.75 billion low rate initial base contract with two years of Low rate Initial Production (LRIP), originally three, and eight option years to procure the first 16,901 vehicles for both the Army and Marines. The Army initially refused to detail why the L-ATV was chosen over its competitors, likely owing to anticipations of protests from the losing bidders.

On 8 September it was disclosed that Lockheed Martin would protest the award to Oshkosh; on the same day it was also disclosed that AM General had decided not to file a protest. Any work that would be performed under the contract stopped during the review period. On December 15 the Government Accountability Office (GAO) dismissed Lockheed Martin's protest because the company on December 11 decided to file a “Notice of Post-Award Bid Protest” with the U.S. Court of Federal Claims; according to a source with knowledge of the procedures, it is uncommon for a company to file with the court close to a GAO protest decision. Immediately after the GAO dismissed the protest, the Army instructed Oshkosh to resume work on the JLTV order. Lockheed filed their preliminary injunction on 17 December, claiming that new Army-supplied information related to the contract emerged toward the end of the GAO's protest process that was not considered before their ruling and no deadline extension was granted. On 17 February 2016, Lockheed withdrew their protest of the JLTV contract award decision in the Court of Federal Claims, potentially as a result of the release of JLTV testing data showing that the L-ATV lasted nearly six times longer between significant breakdown than Lockheed's vehicle.

The first JLTV order was announced on 23 March 2016 with the U.S. Army ordering 657 JLTVs. The $243 million order included vehicles for the Army and Marines. For clarity, as part of the original JLTV LRIP/FRP Base Award in August 2015, an initial 201 JLTVs for the test and evaluation phase were ordered. The 657-vehicle order is an exercised option from the program's eight option years.

In June 2017 the first US soldiers to receive JLTVs was revealed. According to the Army its first unit to receive JLTVs would be an infantry brigade combat team in the 10th Mountain Division at Fort Drum and according to the Marines, a yet-to-be-identified infantry battalion within II Marine Expeditionary Force at Camp Lejeune, North Carolina, would receive its JLTVs in July 2019. Also in June 2017 the Marines revealed they wished to adjust their acquisition objective for JLTV by 65% to up to 9,091 vehicles.

At AUSA 2017 JLTV's were displayed in three new configurations. Oshkosh displayed a General Purpose variant fitted with a Boeing Compact Laser Weapon System (CLWS), a Kongsberg Protector LW 30 Remote Weapon System (RWS) with a M230LF cannon, and a communications suite that includes a Thales VRC-111 and Thales VRC-121 VIPER. The company also displayed a Utility variant equipped with the Boeing Maneuver Short Range Air Defense (SHORAD) Launcher including a M3P .50 cal machine gun, M299 launcher with four Longbow Hellfire missiles, sensor suite, and a communications suite including a Thales VRC-111. Rafael displayed a General Purpose vehicle fitted with the company's Samson RWS Dual Stabilized Remote Weapon Systems (RWS) with M230 LF, and the Trophy Light Active Protection System (APS).

In early 2018 the Marines 2018 Planning Objective for JLTV was disclosed to be 9,091, although funding (as of April 2018) allowed for only 7,622 JLTVs through FY 2023, with deliveries concluding the first quarter of FY 2025. The Marines announced on 28 January 2019 that its first JLTV had fielded that day at the School of Infantry West at Camp Pendleton, California. The Marine Corps declared initial operational capability for the JLTV on 2 August 2019. For the Army, at AUSA 2018 Colonel Shane Fullmer confirmed the service would begin equipping its first unit with 350 JLTVs in January 2019 and complete the fielding in March 2019.

On 20 June 2019, Dr. Bruce Jette, Assistant Secretary of the Army for Acquisition, Logistics and Technology, approved the JLTV program's transition into full–rate production (FRP).

In July 2019 an initial Sources Sought notice (W56HZV19R0242) was issued for the A2 JLTV recompete program. Four draft Request For Proposals (RFPs) followed, these on 3 April 2020, 11 December 2020, 30 April 2021, and 29 October 2021.

JLTV totals have varied over time and numerous suggestions as to ultimate totals and production increases/decreases have been touted, but as of January 2022 JLTV requirements were stated by Micheal Sprang, JLTV Project Director to be: Army – 49,099 (this figure has remained relatively constant); Marine Corps – 12,500 (approx.); Air Force – 2000 (dependent on funding); Navy (approx. 400).

In terms of contracts and orders, the initial JLTV contract award in summation had a potential value of US$6.749 billion and called for a maximum of 16,901 JLTVs. The second and follow-on sole source to Oshkosh contract allows for 6,262 JLTVs to be ordered by November 2023. In September 2020 a Justification and Approval (J&A) for up to an additional 6,262 JLTVs was granted, the original notice (W56HZV-15-C-0095-P00282) published on 30 June 2020. This award will enable continued JLTV production, industry successfully arguing that it required up to 33 months with the JLTV TDP package to be able to respond to the A2 JLTV RfP. The up to 6,262 JLTVs approved will technically be delivered under a separate second JLTV contract, but the original contract costings and timelines remain. Final orders are to be placed in November 2023, with deliveries permitted until late 2025, but expected to conclude mid-2025. The JLTV re-compete award will allow for 15,586 JLTV when awarded.

As of April 2022, 15 JLTV delivery orders had been placed:

 August 2015: 201 as part of the original JLTV base award and for the test and evaluation phase
 March 2016: 657; value $243 million
 September 2016: 130; value $42 million
 January 2017: 409; value $179 million
 August 2017: 748; value $195 million
 September 2017: 611; value $177 million
 December 2017: 258; value $100.1 million
 February 2018: 416; value $106 million
 June 2018: 1,574; value $484 million
 November 2018: 6,107; value $1.69 billion
 December 2019: 2,721; value $803.9 million
 February 2020: 1,240; value $407.3 million (includes unspecified quantities for Slovenia and Lithuania as FMS)
 July 2020: 248; value $127 million
 November 2020: 2,679; value $884.4 million (brought the total of JLTVs ordered for U.S. forces to date to 17,731, and was technically the first order under the second contract. Also included were 59 JLTVs valued at USD23 for Brazil, Lithuania, and Macedonia, making the overall total 2,738 JLTVs)
 November 2021: 1,544; value including FMS is $591 million
(all orders include unspecified quantities of training, support, kits and/or trailers)

Current U.S. Army and Marines orders are for around 19,150 JLTVs.

Design 
Given the competitive nature of the JLTV competition (and recompete), only limited technical detail has been released by either the US Army or Oshkosh. This directly impacts on available L-ATV technical detail. Only nominal dimensions and limited operating weight and automotive data is available.

The L-ATV is based around Oshkosh's TAK-4i (i = intelligent) independent suspension system. Around 26,000 military vehicles are fitted with an earlier version of the system, these including the Oshkosh Medium Tactical Vehicle Replacement (MTVR), Oshkosh Logistic Vehicle System Replacement (LVSR), and Oshkosh MRAP All-Terrain Vehicle (M-ATV); the TAK-4 system has also been retro-fitted to the Force Protection Inc Cougar and BAE Systems RG-33 MRAPs. The majority of systems supplied pre-JLTV have been coil-sprung.

Motive power is provided by a digitally-controlled Gale Banks Engineering 866T V-8 diesel, this based on the architecture of the General Motors (GM) Duramax LML. Power output is 340 hp. In commercial use power output of the standard Duramax LML engine is currently up to 397 hp (296 kW) at 3,000 rpm. Production of the Duramax LML engine concluded in 2017, the unit replaced by the Duramax LP5. JLTV A1 models that were introduced in 2017 are powered by a derivation of this engine. The A2 JLTV will be powered by the next generation of the Duramax engine, production of the current Duramax MY2020 L5P scheduled to conclude Q3FY22. An Allison 2500SP six-speed fully automatic transmission is fitted to all JLTV. The L-ATV can be fitted with the Oshkosh ProPulse diesel-electric powertrain, previously fitted to the Oshkosh Heavy Expanded Mobility Tactical Truck (HEMTT) and MTVR. According to Oshkosh literature, the ProPulse diesel-electric powertrain dramatically improves fuel economy by up to 35 percent in certain circumstances and serves as an on-board generator with enough output to power an entire airfield or hospital, generating up to 120 kW of AC power for external operations; the hybrid powertrain was not a requirement of the JLTV program. A hybrid electric JLTV was unveiled in January 2022, this fitted with a lithium-ion battery pack.

In a Limited User Test (LUT), the L-ATV demonstrated reliability of 7,051 "Mean Miles Between Operational Mission Failure," more than the Humvee and either other JLTV competitor.

The L-ATV offers protection levels greater than those of up-armored HMMWVs and comparable to those of original MRAP class designs, but in an overall vehicle package that is considerably smaller and lighter than vehicles procured under the US Marines MRAP procurement. The L-ATV is fully compliant with the US Army's Long Term Armor Strategy (LTAS), based around the A-kit/B-kit modular armor principle. The A-kit, which is installed during build, is primarily fixings for add-on armor but can include small amounts of armor fitted in difficult-to-reach areas. The B-kit is essentially the add-on armor, this added when required and as a modular add-on. According to the US Army, the A-kit/B-kit concept allows the Army flexibility in several areas: the armor B-kit can be taken off when not needed – reducing unnecessary wear and tear on the vehicles; the Army can continue to pursue upgrades in armor protection – adapting B-kits to match the threat; and the versatility of the B-kit enables the transfer of armor from unit to unit – making armor requirements affordable by pooling assets versus buying armor that is only for one vehicle. Oshkosh developed the CORE 1080 crew protection system for the vehicle, comprising the hull design, armor materials, a fire-extinguishing system, and energy-absorbing floors, seats, and restraint systems for crew members and stowage.

The Oshkosh M-ATV, which was procured primarily for Afghanistan where the earlier and bigger/heavier MRAPs had mobility issues, has protection comparable to the original MRAP designs, but while smaller it still remains a relatively large vehicle. During the L-ATV design process, every component was optimized for survivability, resulting in the same level of protection in a vehicle 30 percent smaller.

The base L-ATV does not have a standard armament, however it can be fitted with a selection of weapons including light, medium, and heavy machine guns, automatic grenade launchers, or anti-tank guided missiles (ATGMs) depending on user requirements. The weapons can be operated from ring mounts or a remote weapon station. Smoke grenade launchers for self-defence can also be fitted if required.

The JLTV family and its nomenclature evolved throughout the development process and to date the U.S. Army has allocated M designations to four individual JLTV configurations. The JLTV family now consists of three base vehicle platforms, Utility (JLTV-UTL), Close Combat Weapons Carrier (JLTV-CCWC) and General Purpose (JLTV-GP). The Utility base vehicle platform is a two-door configuration, the General Purpose and Close Combat Weapons Carrier base vehicle platforms are a four-door configuration. Standard U.S. military M-designators are applied base vehicle platforms when outfitted to a specific Mission Package Configuration. These currently are:
 M1278 Heavy Guns Carrier – General Purpose (JLTV-GP) base vehicle platform in Heavy Guns Carrier Mission Package Configuration
 M1279 Utility – Utility (JLTV-UTL) base vehicle platform in Utility Mission Package Configuration
 M1280 General Purpose – General Purpose (JLTV-GP) base vehicle platform in General Purpose Mission Package Configuration
 M1281 Close Combat Weapons Carrier – Close Combat Weapons Carrier (JLTV-CCWC) base vehicle platform in Close Combat Weapons Carrier Mission Package Configuration

There is also a companion trailer (JLTV-T), towable by all JLTV variants.

Additionally, On 11 May 2016, the Army confirmed a plan, suggested since late 2015, to use the JLTV for the Light Reconnaissance Vehicle (LRV) requirement. By Q4 2020 the LRV requirement had evolved to such an extent that it excluded the JLTV, requiring a six-person crew.

Oshkosh showcased for the first time the L-ATV Ambulance at the Association of the United States Army (AUSA) Global Force Symposium in Huntsville, AL, from March 26–28, 2019. The L-ATV Ambulance is based on the Utility configuration base platform and the rear can hold 4 litters or up to 8 seated patients or a combination of the two. At present the L-ATV Ambulance is not a JLTV variant.

JLTV/L-ATV; foreign interest and operators

Current operators

 : Brazilian Marine Corps – On 5 October 2020, the Brazilian Marine Corps signed a contract for a batch of 12 JLTVs, to be delivered between 2022 and 2026. In September 2021 it was reported that the Brazilian Marine Corps (CFN) was looking to acquire an additional 48 JLTVs. On 02 March 2023, the Brazilian Marine Corps (CFN) received four vehicles of the first batch of 12.  
 : Lithuanian Army – On 21 November 2019, Lithuania and the U.S. signed a contract for 200 JLTVs with options for 200 more. The first batch of 50 was delivered in August 2021.
 : Armed Forces of Montenegro – Montenegro signed a US$36.17 million contract for the procurement of 67 JLTVs, announced on 23 October 2019. The first 20 vehicles arrived in 2020, and deliveries will be completed during 2023. Montenegro is to acquire 55 JLTVs in basic configuration, eight in anti-tank configuration, and the remaining four in medical and command configurations.
: Slovenian Ground Force – Signed government-to-government agreement for the procurement of 38 Oshkosh JLTVs in November 2018, with deliveries to take place in 2021–2023. The JLTV order announced in February 2020 included JLTVs for Slovenia but the actual quantity was not disclosed. The vehicles were unveiled to the public on June 4. In June 2021 Slovenia announced it will order another 37 JLTVs during 2021. On 14 September 2021, a contract was signed for an additional 37 JLTVs. It is planned to purchase up to a total of 99 JLTVs.
 : U.S. Army, U.S. Marine Corps and U.S. Air Force – Original contract award on 25 August 2015. Overall requirements have fluctuated, but as of January 2022 were stated by Micheal Sprang, JLTV Project Director to be: Army – 49,099 (this figure has remained relatively constant); Marine Corps – 12,500 (approx.); Air Force – 2000 (dependent on funding); Navy (approx. 400). The initial JLTV contract award had a potential value of US$6.749 billion and called for a maximum of 16,901 JLTVs. The second sole source to Oshkosh contract allows for 6,262 JLTVs to be ordered by November 2023. The JLTV re-compete award will allow for 15,586 JLTV when awarded. Current U.S. Army and Marines orders are for around 19,150 JLTVs.

Future operators
 : Belgian Army – Belgium's Council of Ministers approved the purchase of 322 JLTVs in September 2020 for EUR135 million. In service the JLTV will replace the Iveco LMV fleet for command and liaison missions, and 20 examples will be configured as ambulances. The contract also includes a multiyear open agreement for technical assistance. First deliveries are anticipated in 2023.
 : The U.S. Army announced a JLTV contract modification in November 2020 that identified North Macedonia as a customer. North Macedonia's Long Term Defence Capability Development Plan predicts the acquisition by 2024 of 96 JLTVs.
 : The Romanian Ministry of National Defence (MoND) confirmed in July 2021 that it will acquire more than 100 JLTVs for Romanian special forces under a EUR47 million contract.

Potential operators
 – Portuguese Army – In April 2020, Portugal announced that it would be seeking to procure the JLTV through the US Foreign Military Sales program. If purchased, the JLTV would replace the Land Rover Defender series and the Toyota Land Cruiser HZJ73LV vehicles currently used by the Portuguese Army.
: British Army – In June 2016 it was reported that to meet Package 1 of the Multi Role Vehicle-Protected (MRV-P) requirement, the UK Ministry of Defence (MoD) was in talks with the Pentagon on acquiring the JLTV via the Foreign Military Sales (FMS) route. While there had been little official movement or comment on the project by February 2022, Janes reported that the requirement remained and had not been cancelled.

Gallery

See also 
 Joint Light Tactical Vehicle (JTLV)
 Oshkosh M-ATV
 Oshkosh Corporation
 Palletized Load System (PLS)
 Medium Tactical Vehicle Replacement (MTVR)
 Family of Medium Tactical Vehicles (FMTV)
 Heavy Equipment Transport System (HET)
 Logistic Vehicle System Replacement (LVSR)

References

External links 

 AUSA 2015: Oshkosh Defense on their L-ATV for JLTV (October 2015 video)
 Oshkosh L-ATV website
 
 
 
 
 
 
 
 
 

Military light utility vehicles
Oshkosh vehicles
Post–Cold War armored fighting vehicles of the United States
Military vehicles introduced in the 2010s